The 2022 Coppa Bernocchi (also known as the Coppa Bernocchi – GP Banco BPM for sponsorship reasons) was the 103rd edition of the Coppa Bernocchi road cycling one day race, which was held in and around Legnano, Italy, on 3 October 2022.

Teams 
14 of the 19 UCI WorldTeams, nine UCI ProTeams, and two UCI Continental teams make up the 25 teams that participated in the race. All but five teams entered a full squad of seven riders. In total, 175 riders started the race, of which 109 finished.

UCI WorldTeams

 
 
 
 
 
 
 
 
 
 
 
 
 
 

UCI ProTeams

 
 
 
 
 
 
 
 
 

UCI Continental Teams

Result

References

External links 
  

Coppa Bernocchi
Coppa Bernocchi
Legnano
2022 in Italian sport